The Strip is an Australian television drama series that screened on the Nine Network. The series premiered on the Nine Network at 8:30pm on 4 September 2008 but was moved to a later 10:30pm timeslot from 13 November 2008. The show did not return for a second season, due to disappointing ratings.

Overview
The Strip is a police detective drama series that follows investigations into crimes on the Gold Coast, Queensland, colloquially referred to as "The Strip". Visually, the program took much inspiration from CSI: Miami and was filmed with images of sparkling surf, aerial shots of buildings and golden sands, as well as similar post production filters and colouring. It had a budget of A$7.8 million.

Cast
Aaron Jeffery (McLeod's Daughters) as Detective Jack Cross
Vanessa Gray as Detective Frances "Frankie" Tully
Simone McAullay (Blue Heelers) as Plain Clothes Constable Jessica McCay
Bob Morley (Home and Away) as Plain Clothes Constable Tony Moretti
Frankie J. Holden as Inspector Max Nelson
Guests in the series include Jay Laga'aia, Martin Sacks, Indiana Evans, Matthew Newton, Gillian Alexy, and Tahyna Tozzi.

Episodes

DVD releases
The Strip was released on DVD on 4 July 2009.

See also
 List of Australian television series

References

External links
The Strip at the Australian Television Information Archive
Download for Free episodes of "The Strip" from Ninemsn website

2008 Australian television series debuts
2008 Australian television series endings
Australian drama television series
Nine Network original programming
Television shows set in Gold Coast, Queensland
Television series by Fremantle (company)